Ateneo may refer to:

Cultural institutions 
 Ateneo de la Juventud, a society of Mexican writers, philosophers and intellectuals
 Ateneo de Madrid, a private cultural institution located in the capital of Spain
 Ateneo de Ponce, a nonprofit, civic, organization in Ponce, Puerto Rico
 Ateneo Puertorriqueño, one of Puerto Rico's chief cultural institutions
 Ateneo de Sevilla, a cultural, scientific, literary, and artistic association in Seville, Spain
 Ateneo Veneto, an institution for science, literature, and arts in Venice, Italy

Schools named Ateneo run by the Society of Jesus in the Philippines

Teaching and research universities 
 Ateneo de Davao University
 Ateneo de Manila University
 Ateneo de Naga University
 Ateneo de Zamboanga University
 Xavier University – Ateneo de Cagayan

Non-tertiary Schools 
 Sacred Heart School – Ateneo de Cebu
 Ateneo de Iloilo - Santa Maria Catholic School

Defunct institutions 
 Ateneo de San Pablo
 Ateneo de Tuguegarao

Other uses 
 El Ateneo Grand Splendid, a bookshop in Buenos Aires, Argentina
 Ateneo F.C., an association football club based in Quezon City in the Philippines
 Athenaeus of Naucratis, ancient Greek rhetorician and grammarian

See also 
 
 
 Athenaeum (disambiguation)